Air Regional was an airline based in Jakarta, Indonesia. It operated domestic and international air charter services in the Papua region, with principal bases in  2018 focussing at Sorong Airport (SOQ), serving the West Central Region and Nabire Airport (NBX) to handle the East Central Region.

History 
The airline was established on 13 August 2001, and began operations under Air Regional AOC 135 #027 on 16 October 2002. It was founded and is owned by Captain Pinky Firmansyah, President and Chief Executive Officer of the company. It had 50 employees as of March 2007.

Destinations
 Raja Ampat
 Sorong
 Fak Fak
 Kaimana
 Timika
 Faowi 
 Beoga 
 Magoda 
 Apowo 
 Kegata 
 Bugalaga 
 Komopa 
 Bilai 
 Timepa 
 Modio 
 Jila
 Agats
 Ewer
 Mapenduma 
 Angguruk
 Wagethe
 Serui
 Ilaga 
 Manokwari
 Zugapa
 Silimo
 Ninia 
 Obano 
 Mulia 
 Ilu 
 Pogapa 
 Borme
 Kuyawagi 
 Bokondini 
 Biak
 Serui
 Elilim 
 Yahukimo
 Abmisibil
 Sumtamon
 Borme
 Apalapsili
 Korupun
 Kenyam
 Timipa
 Epouto
 Tiom 
 Nduga 
 Modio
 Enarotali
 Holuwon
 Tanah Merah
 Kimaam
 Merauke

Fleet 
The Air Regional fleet includes the following aircraft as of March 2007:
3 De Havilland Canada DHC-6 Twin Otter Series 300 Papua, Indonesia

Air Regional will include following aircraft/s in its additional fleet plan (as of December 2018):
2 (DHC6) installed with Wipaire Amphibian Floats equipped with SAR and EMS Air Ambulance
1 Airbus AS350B3 helicopter (AS350B3) equipped with SAR and EMS Air Ambulance

References

External links

Defunct airlines of Indonesia
Airlines established in 2001
2018 disestablishments in Indonesia
Indonesian companies established in 2001
Airlines disestablished in 2018